Muhammad Rudi (born 20 October 1963) is the mayor of Batam, the largest city in the Riau Islands province after being elected in 2015 where he won 185,845 votes (60.40%) in the 2-candidate race. Previously, he had served as deputy mayor for 5 years. During his tenures in the city governance, he had been member of three political parties: National Awakening Party until 2013, Democratic Party until 2016, and currently he is a member of the Nasdem Party.

References

Living people
1963 births
Batam
Mayors and regents of places in the Riau Islands
Nasdem Party politicians